The GCC U-17 Championship was played for the 5th time in 2008.

The championship was held in Saudi Arabia.

Only 4 nations participated, Saudi Arabia, UAE, Oman and Bahrain. The nations used it as preparation for the upcoming AFC Youth Championship.

Participating nations

  Bahrain
  Oman
  Saudi Arabia
  UAE

Fixtures and results

Final group

Winners

Awards

See also 
Football at the Southeast Asian Games
AFC
AFC Asian Cup
East Asian Cup
Arabian Gulf Cup
South Asian Football Federation Cup
West Asian Football Federation Championship

 

Gulf Cup Of Nations
2008
GCC U-17 Championship
2008 in youth association football